Smith Point can refer to the following:

Smith Point County Park, a park in New York, United States.
Smith Point Light, a lighthouse in Virginia, United States.
Smith Point, Texas
Smith Point, Northern Territory, a locality in Australia
Smith Point Airport, airport serving the locality
Smith Point (Antarctica)